Ankara Atatürk Anatolian High School, established in 1971, is one of the oldest Anatolian High Schools of Ankara and Turkey. It is located in the Beştepe, Ankara neighborhood.

The high school selects its students using the standardized test of National Anatolian High Schools Examination. It is one of the leading schools in Turkey with success at the National University Entrance Examination.

The current principal is Baki Gencer.

The selective process is extremely picky. Only the top students, 0.4% from the standardized testing, can apply to the school, placing it amongst the best high schools in Turkey.

References

Ankara Atatürk Anadolu Lisesi website

Educational institutions established in 1971
High schools in Ankara
1971 establishments in Turkey
Things named after Mustafa Kemal Atatürk
Anatolian High Schools